Bahrain Raid Xtreme also known as BRX is a rally raid team that participates in the World Rally-Raid Championship (W2RC) and the Dakar Rally.

History 

On June 15, 2020 the Kingdom of Bahrain's plans for launching the team were revealed. The team was founded by the Bahrain's sovereign wealth fund Mumtalakat Holding Company, which entered a partnership with the British team Prodrive and together they established Prodrive International in a joint venture.  

BRX is directed by David Richards and Gus Beteli is the team principal.

2021 
BRX made their debut at the 2021 Dakar Rally with Drivers Sébastien Loeb and Nani Roma, driving the Prodrive BRX Hunter. Loeb did not finish the event while Roma was 5th in the T1 cars Category.

2022 
BRX made their debut in the inaugural World Rally-Raid Championship (W2RC).

At the 2022 Dakar Rally Loeb finished 2nd while Terranova finished 4th and Roma finished 21st.

Fighting for points in the W2RC, Loeb participated in the Abu Dhabi Desert Challenge and took the points lead at 112 points from Nasser Al-Attiyah at a 111 points.

2023 
BRX continued their participation in the World Rally-Raid Championship (W2RC), fielding updated Hunters for Sebastien Loeb and Orlando Terranova. The team also operated a Hunter for Guerlain Chicherit, entered into the W2RC under the GC Kompetition banner. Vaidotas Žala was also added as a customer for the 2023 Dakar under the Teltonika Racing banner.

At the 2023 Dakar, Loeb finished 2nd and Chicherit ended up 10th overall. Terranova retired after aggravating an earlier back injury, while Zala was forced to exit with mechanical issues. Loeb won 7 stages and set a record for the most consecutive stage wins in Dakar history, with 6 stage wins from stage 8 to stage 13 and Chicherit added to the tally with 2 stage wins. However, the Hunter was beset by a propensity for punctures - with heavy time losses for all Hunter crews on the rocky stage 2 - and many mechanical issues throughout the rally, prevented a proper shot at the top step of the podium, with Loeb's final deficit to the winner being 1 hour, 20 minutes & 49 seconds.

Results

Complete World Rally-raid Championship results

(key)

*Season still in progress 

Roma withdrew from the 2022 World_Rally-Raid_Championship due to health issues. Terranova retired from the 2023 Dakar Rally due to aggravating an earlier back injury. Chicherit's Hunter is operated by BRX, but is entered under the GCK Motorsport banner.

Complete Dakar Rally results

External Links
Bahrain Raid Xtreme Website 

Bahrain Raid Xtreme on Instagram 

Bahrain Raid Xtreme on Facebook 

Bahrain Raid Xtreme on Twitter

References 

date=March 2022
Motorsport in Bahrain